Albert Eschenlohr (10 March 1898 – 9 December 1938) was a German international footballer.

References

1898 births
1938 deaths
Association football midfielders
German footballers
Germany international footballers
Tennis Borussia Berlin players